Amnirana asperrima is a species of frog in the family Ranidae. It is found in Cameroon and Nigeria. Its natural habitats are subtropical or tropical moist lowland forests, subtropical or tropical moist montane forests, and rivers. It is threatened by habitat loss.

References

asperrima
Amphibians described in 1977
Taxonomy articles created by Polbot